Rockwood Chocolate Factory Historic District is a historic industrial complex and national historic district in Fort Greene, Brooklyn, New York City.  The complex consists of 16 contributing buildings built between 1891 and 1928 and owned by Rockwood & Company until it went out of business in 1957.  The largest and oldest building (Building 1 and 2) dates to 1891 and is located at the corner of Washington and Park avenues.  It is a five-story, Romanesque Revival style building.  Much of the complex has been converted to loft apartments.

It was listed on the National Register of Historic Places in 1983.  It has been incorporated into the Wallabout Industrial Historic District.

References

External links

"History Lessons: Sweet Spot," The New York Times Local, By Margaret Eby, June 5, 2009

Romanesque Revival architecture in New York City
Fort Greene, Brooklyn
Historic districts on the National Register of Historic Places in Brooklyn